Maurice Faure (26 June 1859 – 1945) was a French sports shooter. He competed at the 1906 Intercalated Games and the 1912 Summer Olympics. He won a bronze medal at the 1906 Intercalated Games. He was also awarded a retrospective silver medal in live pigeon shooting at the 1900 Summer Olympics, although the Olympic status of the event is disputed.

References

External links
 

1859 births
1945 deaths
French male sport shooters
Olympic shooters of France
Shooters at the 1906 Intercalated Games
Shooters at the 1912 Summer Olympics
People from Chaville
Olympic medalists in shooting
Medalists at the 1906 Intercalated Games
Sportspeople from Hauts-de-Seine
Shooters at the 1900 Summer Olympics
Date of death missing
Place of death missing
Olympic silver medalists for France
Medalists at the 1900 Summer Olympics